Ellen Schmidt (1922–1997) was a German art director active in film set design in the postwar era. She frequently collaborated with her husband Mathias Matthies, including on several Edgar Wallace adaptations.

Selected filmography
 Dark Eyes (1951)
 The Sinful Border (1951)
 Shooting Stars (1952)
 My Wife Is Being Stupid (1952)
 Don't Worry About Your Mother-in-Law (1954)
 Men at a Dangerous Age (1954)
 I Was an Ugly Girl (1955)
 My Children and I (1955)
 Father's Day (1955)
 The First Day of Spring (1956)
 The Girl from the Marsh Croft (1958)
 Crime After School (1959)
 Yes, Women are Dangerous (1960)
 The Forger of London (1961)
 The Green Archer (1961)
 The Inn on the River (1962)
 The Happy Years of the Thorwalds (1962)

References

Bibliography 
 Bergfelder, Tim. International Adventures: German Popular Cinema and European Co-Productions in the 1960s. Berghahn Books, 2005.

External links 
 

1922 births
1997 deaths
People from Gelsenkirchen
German art directors